Marge Ellis is a former international lawn bowler and national team manager from South Africa.

Bowls career
She won a silver medal in the fours as an injury replacement bowler, when called in from her managers position, at the 1996 World Outdoor Bowls Championship in Leamington Spa with Jannie de Beer, Barbara Redshaw, Lorna Trigwell and Hester Bekker.

References

South African female bowls players
South African sportswomen
1926 births
Possibly living people